Angelo Caroli (7 April 1937 – 17 November 2020) was an Italian professional football player, journalist and author.

Career
Caroli was born in L'Aquila. Caroli was a forward player.

At 27 he retired from football, and started to work for Tuttosport as a journalist. Writing became his next muse, and he started to publish poetry and novels. On 17 November 2020, Caroli died at the age of 83.

Honours
 Serie A champion: 1960/61.

Select Bibliography
Il grido: thriller (1998). Arezzo: Limina. 
Il volo della farfalla dalle piume azzurre : il killer della Sindone (2005). Turin: Fògola.

References

1937 births
2020 deaths
People from L'Aquila
Italian footballers
Serie A players
Juventus F.C. players
Catania S.S.D. players
S.S.D. Lucchese 1905 players
Calcio Lecco 1912 players
Association football forwards
Italian sports journalists
Italian male poets
20th-century Italian male writers
21st-century Italian male writers
Footballers from Abruzzo
Sportspeople from the Province of L'Aquila